Trident Studios was a British recording facility, located at 17 St Anne's Court in London's Soho district between 1968 and 1981. It was constructed in 1967 by Norman Sheffield, drummer of the 1960s group the Hunters, and his brother Barry.

"My Name is Jack" by Manfred Mann was recorded at Trident in March 1968, and helped launch the studio's reputation. Later that year, the Beatles recorded their song "Hey Jude" there and part of their self-titled double album (also known as the "White Album"). Other well-known albums and songs recorded at Trident include Elton John's "Your Song", David Bowie's The Rise and Fall of Ziggy Stardust and the Spiders from Mars, Lou Reed's Transformer, Carly Simon's No Secrets, and Queen's albums Queen, Queen II and Sheer Heart Attack.

Other artists recorded at Trident included the Bee Gees, Chris de Burgh, Frank Zappa, Genesis, Brand X, James Taylor, Joan Armatrading, Joe Cocker, Golden Earring, Harry Nilsson, Kiss, Tygers of Pan Tang, Lou Reed, Peter Gabriel, Marc Almond, Marc and the Mambas, Soft Cell, Rick Springfield, the Rolling Stones, Rush, Free, Thin Lizzy, Tina Turner, T.Rex, Van der Graaf Generator, Yes and John Entwistle.

The Sheffield brothers had a relaxed working attitude, but also emphasised high standards of audio engineering. The studio's state-of-the-art recording equipment helped attract many major artists to record there.

The studios are still in operation, now specialising in post-production for TV and Film.

The Beatles and Apple Records
In mid-1968, Trident Studios was the first in the UK to use Dolby noise reduction, and employ an eight-track reel-to-reel recording deck.

While Abbey Road Studios still only used four-track at the time, Trident's Ampex eight-track machine drew the Beatles on 31 July 1968 to record their song "Hey Jude". Paul McCartney later said about recording the track at Trident: "Words cannot describe the pleasure of listening back to the final mix of 'Hey Jude' on four giant Tannoy speakers which dwarfed everything else in the room ..." The band also recorded some songs for their 1968 double album The Beatles (also known as the White Album) at Trident – "Dear Prudence", "Honey Pie", "Savoy Truffle" and "Martha My Dear" – and on February 22, 1969, they first recorded "I Want You (She's So Heavy)" there for the album Abbey Road. John Lennon and Yoko Ono later returned with the Plastic Ono Band to record "Cold Turkey" featuring Eric Clapton on lead guitar.

Many of the Beatles' Apple Records artists used Trident Studios, including Badfinger, Billy Preston, Mary Hopkin, Jackie Lomax and James Taylor. Part of George Harrison's triple album All Things Must Pass, containing the hit "My Sweet Lord", and Ringo Starr's "It Don't Come Easy", were also recorded there. Harry Nilsson recorded "Without You" at Trident, and portions of several of his 1970s albums.

Queen
The history of the Sheffield brothers and Trident Studios is also linked to the early discovery and success of the rock band Queen. In 1972, Trident Studios started two record production companies, one of which (Neptune Productions) initially signed three artists, Mark Ashton, Eugene Wallace and Queen. The agreements with the artists were for recording and publishing, but Queen had no management, so they insisted that Trident also take on that responsibility. Trident, initially reluctant, eventually agreed and Queen signed an agreement with Trident Recording, Publishing and Management, on 1 November 1972.

The Management at the time claimed the deal allowed the band full access to the studio's cutting edge facilities, and supported them by providing the best producers and engineers - so long as the foundations of the band's first album Queen were recorded 'off peak'. Roger Taylor later quoted these early off-peak studio hours as "gold dust".

After the album was completed the Sheffield brothers had great difficulty finding a record label to take on the album and release it. Finally, eight months later, the brothers decided to take on the risk and fund the release themselves and Queen released their self-titled first album under the Trident label in a license deal with EMI Records in the UK and Elektra Records in the US. Trident subsequently released Queen II and Sheer Heart Attack under this same arrangement. After the band left Trident, they signed directly with EMI and Elektra for A Night at the Opera .

The 2018 Queen biopic Bohemian Rhapsody featured a dramatisation of the studio, during the making of Seven Seas of Rhye.

David Bowie, Elton John and others
In March 1968, Manfred Mann recorded Trident's first number one at the studio, the single "My Name Is Jack". From 1968 to 1981, some of the most reputed artists used the studios for their recordings, including David Bowie, Elton John, Marc Bolan/T.Rex, Carly Simon, Frank Zappa, the Rolling Stones, Free, Genesis, Lou Reed, Joan Armatrading, Black Sabbath, Lindisfarne, Dusty Springfield, the Mahavishnu Orchestra, Krisma, Jeff Beck/Rod Stewart and other artists. Elton John's "Your Song" and Carly Simon's "You're So Vain" were both engineered at Trident by Robin Geoffrey Cable, who later went on to produce two albums for The Dickies.

Tony Stratton-Smith's Charisma Records was also one of the most regular clients of the studios during the 1970s. Genesis recorded several of their most renowned albums there, including Trespass (1970), Nursery Cryme (1971) and A Trick of the Tail (1976). The jazz fusion band Brand X recorded their debut studio album Unorthodox Behaviour here (1976). Other artists from the label who recorded at Trident were Van der Graaf Generator, Peter Hammill, Lindisfarne and Peter Gabriel. Charisma's first Van der Graaf Generator release, The Least We Can Do Is Wave to Each Other, was recorded at Trident from 11 to 14 December 1969. Most of the album was recorded on eight-track, but the last song, "After the Flood", was recorded on 16. Trident was also among the first studios in the UK to obtain a 16-track machine.

The Trident 'A' Range console

The Trident A Range consoles were originally designed and built as an in house project by Malcolm Toft who was chief recording engineer at Trident and Barry Porter who was in charge of studio maintenance. Other studios heard about it and placed orders for consoles and Trident Audio Developments was formed with Malcolm Toft as managing director. Cherokee Studios in Los Angeles was one of the early recipients of one of the first production models, and ultimately purchased three new from Trident and one from a broker at a later time. David Bowie, Rod Stewart, and Frank Sinatra are among the early artists who first recorded hit records on Cherokee's first 'A' Range console.

"Though it had a very limited run, the Trident A Range console gained a reputation for its very distinct and pleasant sound with a very "musical" EQ section. Along with channel strips from early Neve and Helios consoles, original Trident A Range modules have kept a healthy resale value and are much sought after by engineers who like to combine old-school analogue gear with cutting-edge digital recording technology."

Studio piano 
Trident also gained a reputation for the sound of its piano, which can be heard on the Beatles' "Hey Jude", Elton John's "Your Song", Carly Simon's "The Right Thing To Do", Queen's "Killer Queen" and many other tracks. It was a handmade C. Bechstein concert-sized instrument that was over one hundred years old. The piano was offered for auction in November 2001, but failed to sell.

The giant Tannoy Monitoring Speakers 
From 1968 until 1974, Trident used four very large monitoring loudspeakers in the control room. These speakers were famously documented by Paul McCartney when The Beatles had recorded 'Hey Jude'. "Words cannot describe the pleasure of listening back to the final mix of 'Hey Jude' on four giant Tannoy speakers which dwarfed everything else in the room ...".
The speaker drivers used were the newly developed 15" Dual Concentric Tannoy Monitor Golds. And the cabinets were Lockwood Majors made by Lockwood, UK. Two of these original speakers still exist and photographic evidence to this can be found here.  These monitors are finished in black Formica and have tan coloured speaker grilles (made by Tygan, UK) with a gold bezel/trim.

Later history
Trident Studios was sold in December 1981. It was bought by its senior engineer, Stephen Short, along with three other investors. In 1986, Short bought out the other investors and opened Trident 2 which was opened in 1983 and the investors were J.P. Illiesco and Rusty Egan. There were also another group of producers and investors who tried to buy Trident in the 1980s after its initial closure, headed by Neville Kernick-Nixon, Flood and John Keating; the former then opened The Mad House, later known as The Music Station.

The original Trident mixing desk also survived, and was purchased in the early 1980s from the studio's owners by songwriter and former Cure bassist Phil Thornalley. It is now housed in Thornalley's own recording studio, Swamp Studios in north-west London. The Swamp is actually based around the Trident Tri‑mix desk.

Since 1981, the studios have changed name(s) and hands multiple times, with the original building remaining in situ.

Present day 
The studios are still in operation as a post-production studio under the name 'Trident Audio Post', specialising in "all aspects of sound mixing & recording for TV, Film, Radio and Web since 1993".

The studios now contain voice over and narration recording facilities, ISDN and remote link capabilities, alongside an automated dialogue replacement (ADR) studio, as a part of the TVC Soho group trading under Trident Sound Studio Ltd.

Blue plaque

On 15 June 2017, a British Plaque Trust permanent blue plaque was unveiled outside the building at 17 St Anne's Court, London in the recognition of the multiple David Bowie albums recorded there.

Legacy
Prior to his death, Norman Sheffield, was actively involved in creating Trackd Music, a mobile application and website with his two sons, based around Trident's former business allowing aspiring and professional musicians to record songs using an 8 track mixer within the app and promote their music via their profile within the app or website. The app has amassed over a million downloads worldwide to date.

Partial discography
The following is a partial list of work either recorded, mixed or mastered at Trident Studios between 1968 and 1981, edited from the timeline on the Trident Studios official website.

References

External links
 Trident Studios Official FaceBook Page
 Tannoyista.com

Record labels established in 1968
Recording studios in London
Media and communications in the City of Westminster
1968 establishments in England
British record labels
Vanity record labels
Rock record labels
Pop record labels
Experimental music record labels
Indian music record labels